Kivdinsky is a rural locality (a settlement) in urban okrug Progress, Amur Oblast, Russia. The population was 14 as of 2018. There are 22 streets.

Geography 
Kivdinsky is located in the valley of the Kivda River, 13 km northwest of Progress (the district's administrative centre) by road. Muravka is the nearest rural locality.

References 

Rural localities in Progress Urban Okrug
Progress, Amur Oblast